Ballylough (Baile-an-locha; "the townland of the lake") is a small village and townland in County Down, Northern Ireland.

It is situated beside Ballylough Lake, popular for fishing for rainbow trout and run by Castlewellan and Annsborough Angling Club.

References

Villages in County Down
Townlands of County Down